is a Japanese former Nippon Professional Baseball catcher/infielder.

References 

1969 births
Living people
Baseball people from Osaka Prefecture 
Japanese baseball players
Nippon Professional Baseball catchers
Nippon Professional Baseball infielders
Nankai Hawks players
Fukuoka Daiei Hawks players
Yomiuri Giants players
People from Hirakata